Edward Tyrone Anthony (born March 3, 1962) is a former American football running back in the National Football League who played for the New Orleans Saints. He played high school football at West Forsyth High School in Clemmons, North Carolina and college football for the North Carolina Tar Heels.

References

1962 births
Living people
American football running backs
American football return specialists
New Orleans Saints players
North Carolina Tar Heels football players